Paul Reuter (1816–1899) was a German-born British entrepreneur.

Paul Reuter may also refer to:

Paul Reuter (composer), American composer
Paul Reuter (lawyer) (1911–1990), European lawyer